Wushu events at the 2021 Southeast Asian Games took place at Cầu Giấy District Sporting Hall in Hanoi, Vietnam from 13 to 15 May 2022.

Medal table

Medalists

Men's taolu

Men's sanda

Women's taolu

Women's sanda

Results

Men sanda 
 56 kg

 60 kg

 65 kg

 70 kg

Women sanda 
 48 kg

 52 kg

 56 kg

 60 kg

References

Wushu
2021
2022 in wushu (sport)